Santo Antão (Portuguese for "Saint Anthony") is the westernmost island of Cape Verde. At , it is the largest of the Barlavento Islands group, and the second largest island of Cape Verde. The nearest island is São Vicente to the southeast, separated by the sea channel Canal de São Vicente. Its population was 38,200 in mid 2019, making it the fourth most populous island of Cape Verde after Santiago, São Vicente and Sal. Its largest city is Porto Novo located on the southern coast (population 9,310 in 2010).

Geography 

The island is of volcanic origin and very mountainous, characterized by two high plateaus and several steep river valleys. The southern part of the island has a desert climate, while the northeast and the higher elevations are semi-arid.

Rivers 

The main rivers of Santo Antão are:

Ribeira de Alto Mira
Ribeira da Cruz
Ribeira da Garça
Ribeira Grande
Ribeira da Janela
Ribeira do Paul
Ribeira das Patas
Ribeira da Torre

Mountains 
The tallest mountain is Tope de Coroa, reaching an elevation of 1,979 m. Other high mountains on the island are Monte Tomé (1,863 m), Gudo de Cavaleiro (1,810 m), Monte Moroços (1,767 m) and Pico da Cruz (1,584 m).

Climate
Santo Antão island has a hot desert climate (Köppen climate classification: BWh) in Sinagoga and Porto Novo and a cold semi-arid climate (Köppen climate classification: BSk) in Espongeiro. The island features very balanced temperatures year round higher on the slopes (~ 800 metres ASL) to cool highland subtropical steppe climate BskL above 1,000 metres ASL. There can be remarkably cool weather in the interior with warmer wet season starting in July and ending in December–January with colder dry season starting in December–January and ending in June. The major climate risk, similarly to other Cape Verdean islands, yet much less pronounced in the higher altitudes due to better ability in gaining moisture from clouds, is drought.

History 
The island was discovered in 1461 or 1462 by Diogo Afonso, together with the islands of São Vicente and São Nicolau. Settlement of the island started in the first half of the 16th century. The main settlement was Ribeira Grande. Other settlements such as Ponta do Sol, Pombas and Porto Novo developed in the 19th century.

In 1732 the Municipality of Santo Antão was created, with its seat in the town Ribeira Grande. In 1867 this was divided into the municipality of Paul (covering the area of current Paul and Porto Novo) and the municipality of Ribeira Grande. These were merged in 1895 into one municipality. The municipalities of Paul and Ribeira Grande were recreated in 1917. The municipality of Porto Novo was created in 1962 when the parishes of São João Baptista and Santo André were separated from the older Municipality of Paul.

Population
In the 1830s, the estimated population of Santo Antão was 24,000.

Economy
Fishing and agriculture are the main industries on the island.

Agriculture

The island's agriculture products include sugar cane, yams, cassava, bananas, mangoes, and grain. The main product on the island is a kind of rum known as grogue.  Mills continue to distill grogue in the Paul Valley.

Due to its mountainous nature, most of the island's plantations are done in terraces, obviating the use of machinery and requiring immense manual labor. Recently, some experiences using drip irrigation have been taking place in order to mitigate the drought conditions.

The exportation of many of the island's agriculture products to other islands has been prohibited for nearly two decades because of the millipede (Spinotarsus caboverdus) blight, but the quarantine was lifted in 2008.

Tourism
Tourism is becoming one of the most dominant industries on the island. There has been some investment in Rural tourism infrastructures. Hiking, Trekking and Cultural tourism account for most of the touristic offer of this island.

Administrative divisions
The island is divided in three municipalities, which are subdivided into civil parishes:

Paul CV-PA
Santo António das Pombas 
Porto Novo CV-PN
São João Baptista
Santo André
Ribeira Grande CV-RG
Nossa Senhora do Rosário
Nossa Senhora do Livramento
Santo Crucifixo
São Pedro Apóstolo

Nature
Santo Antão has 50 endangered species of flora which has the most number in the nation. Several flora found in the island that are also found in some parts of the archipelago includes Aeonium gorgoneum, Artemisia gorgonum, Campanula jacobaea, the Conyza species of feae, pannosa and varia, Echium stenosiphon, Kickxia webbiana, Lavandula rotundifolia, Limonium braunii, Micromeria forbesii, Sonchus daltonii, Capeverdean navelwort (Umbilicus schmidtii) and Verbascum capitis-viridis.  Flora found only in the island include Tornabenea insularis and ribeirensis.

Santo Antão has different species of birds including the Cape Verde (Iago) sparrow, reptiles including the Cape Verde wall gecko and insects including the spider Tetragnatha torrensis, the moth Scopula paneliusi and the water bear Echiniscus clavispinosus.   The island does not have a lot of animal life comparing to other islands. Along its shores, most of the marine life are within Canal de São Vicente.

Culture
Other than Portuguese (official language), the majority of the population speaks Cape Verdean Creole.

Notable people

Jorge Ferreira Chaves (1920–1982), Portuguese architect
Leão Lopes (b. 1948), writer, professor and entertainment director
Gabriel Mariano, essayist, novelist and poet
Luís Romano de Madeira Melo, composer
Manuel de Novas, songwriter
Roberto Duarte Silva (1837–1889), chemist
Antoninho Travadinha, violinist
Dina Salústio, teacher, poet, writer and journalist

See also 

 Charles Darwin volcanic field

External links
University of Massachusetts - information and images from Santo Antão
caboverde.com
Wikivoyage Santo Antão- travel information for Santo Antão
Wikitravel

References 

 
Islands of Cape Verde